Victor Petrovich Dyomin (1937 — 1993) was a Soviet cinema critic, editor, screen writer.

Biography
Victor Dyomin was born in the city of Taganrog in 1937. Graduated from Chekhov Gymnasium (1954) and VGIK (1960). Bachelor of arts (1973). Since 1986 – secretary of the board of the Union of Cinematographers of USSR. In 1987, he was a member of the jury at the 37th Berlin International Film Festival. Chief editor of the magazine Soviet Screen (1989–1993).

Publications
  Фильм без интриги. – М.: Искусство, 1966. – 220 с.
 Жан Марэ. Человек, актёр, миф, маска. – М.: Искусство, 1969. – 240 с.
 Первое лицо: художник и экранные искусства. – М.: Искусство, 1977. – 287 с.
  Стареют ли фильмы? – М.: БПСК, 1978. – 56 с.
  Воспитание чувств. – М., 1980.
  Кино в системе искусств //  Встречи с X музой: Беседы о киноискусстве: Для учащихся старших классов. Кн. 1. – М.: Просвещение, 1981. С.108–166.
  Как делаются фильмы //   Встречи с X музой: Беседы о киноискусстве: Для учащихся старших классов. Кн. 2. – М.: Просвещение, 1981. С.4–78.
  Человек на земле. – М., 1982.
 Витаутас Желакявичус: Портрет режиссёра. – М.: Союзинформкино, 1982. – 32 с.
 Виталий Мельников: Три беседы с режиссёром. – М.: ВБПК, 1984. – 144 с.
  Поговорим о кино. – М.: Знание, 1984. – 63 с.
 Эльдар Рязанов: Творческий портрет. – М.: Союзинформкино, 1984. – 40 с.
 Встречи на опалённой земле. – М., 1985.
Массовые виды искусства и современная художественная культура / Под редакцией Дёмина. – М., 1986.
 Георгий Данелия. – М., 1986.
 Глеб Панфилов. – М., 1986.
 Сергей Соловьёв. – М., 1987.
  Виктор Проскурин: Счастье быть актёром. – М.: Киноцентр, 1988. – [64] с.
 Леонид Марягин: Коллеги и друзья в рассказах режиссёра и портрет самого режиссёра, увиденный критиком. – М.: Союзинформкино, 1988. – 32 с.
  Алоиз Бренч: Творческий портрет. – М., 1990.
 Леонид Ярмольник. – М., 1991.

Filmography
screen writer
   Public Enemy Bukharin (1990)
  Was There Karotin? (1989)
  The Traitress (1977)
  Hamerg Voskan papi hamar (1976)
   Inspiration  (1976)
actor
  Soccer Player (1990)
   Expensive Pleasure (1988)
 Dead Souls (1984)

References

External links
 

1937 births
1993 deaths
Soviet screenwriters
Writers from Taganrog
Soviet film critics
Soviet male actors
Actors from Taganrog
Film theorists
Gerasimov Institute of Cinematography alumni
Russian magazine editors